Hladovka (Polish: Głodówka, Goral: Glodōvka) is a village and municipality in Tvrdošín District in the Žilina Region of northern Slovakia.

History
In historical records the village was first mentioned in 1598. Until 1918/20 it belonged to Hungary, 1920-1924 and 1938–1939 to Poland, 1939–1945 to Slovakia, 1945–1993 to Czechoslovakia.

Geography
The municipality lies at an altitude of 747 metres and covers an area of 18.098 km2. It has a population of about 960 people.

Genealogical resources

The records for genealogical research are available at the state archive "Statny Archiv in Bytca, Slovakia"

 Roman Catholic church records (births/marriages/deaths): 1763-1893 (parish A)

See also
 List of municipalities and towns in Slovakia

References

External links
Municipal website 
Surnames of living people in Hladovka

Villages and municipalities in Tvrdošín District